The 2010 FIBA Europe Under-18 Championship for Women was the 27th edition of the FIBA Europe Under-18 Championship for Women. 16 teams featured the competition, held in Slovakia from July 25–August 8. Spain was the current title holder. Italy won this year's edition.

Teams

Group stages

Preliminary round
In this round, the sixteen teams were allocated in four groups of four teams each. The top three qualified for the qualifying round. The last team of each group played for the 13th–16th place in the Classification Games.

Times given below are in CEST (UTC+2).

Group A

Group B

Group C

Group D

Qualifying round
The twelve teams remaining were allocated in two groups of six teams each. The four top teams advanced to the quarterfinals. The last two teams of each group played for the 9th–12th place.

Group E

Group F

Classification round
The last teams of each group in the preliminary round will compete in this Classification Round. The four teams will play in one group. The last two teams will be relegated to Division B for the next season.

Group G

Knockout round

Championship

Quarterfinals

Semifinals

Bronze medal game

Final

5th–8th playoffs

5th–8th semifinals

7th place playoff

5th place playoff

9th–12th playoffs

9th–12th semifinals

11th place playoff

9th place playoff

Final standings

Awards

All-Tournament Team

 Nika Baric
 Queralt Casas
 Martina Kissova
 Gaia Gorini
 Laura Gil

Statistical leaders

Points

Rebounds

Assists

Blocks

Steals

External links
Official Site

2011
2010–11 in European women's basketball
2010–11 in Slovak basketball
International women's basketball competitions hosted by Romania
International youth basketball competitions hosted by Romania
2010 in youth sport
2010 in Romanian women's sport